The Punta Open is a professional tennis tournament played on clay courts. It is currently part of the ATP Challenger Tour. It has been held annually in Punta del Este, Uruguay from 1993 until 1999 (with the exception of 1998) and was reinstalled in 2018.

Past finals

Singles

Doubles

ATP Challenger Tour
Clay court tennis tournaments
Tennis tournaments in Uruguay
Punta del Este